Communist University may refer to:
Communist University of the National Minorities of the West
Communist University of the Toilers of the East
Leningrad Communist University
Sverdlov Communist University